Szczepan Lewna is a politician and Kashubian activist. He was the chairman of Kashubian-Pomeranian Association in the period 1983–1986.

References

Polish people of Kashubian descent
Polish language activists
Living people
Year of birth missing (living people)
Place of birth missing (living people)